The 2008/09 FIS Freestyle Skiing World Cup was the thirtieth World Cup season in freestyle skiing organised by International Ski Federation. The season started on 18 December 2008 and ended on 20 March 2009. This season included four disciplines: moguls, ski cross, aerials and halfpipe.

Dual mogul counted together with moguls ranking and for moguls title.

Men

Moguls

Ski Cross

Aerials

Halfpipe

Women

Moguls

Ski Cross

Aerials

Halfpipe

Men's standings

Overall 

Standings after 27 races.

Moguls 

Standings after 9 races.

Aerials 

Standings after 6 races.

Ski Cross 

Standings after 9 races.

Halfpipe 

Standings after 3 races.

Women's standings

Overall 

Standings after 29 races.

Moguls 

Standings after 9 races.

Aerials 

Standings after 7 races.

Ski Cross 

Standings after 10 races.

Halfpipe 

Standings after 3 races.

Nations Cup

Overall 

Standings after 56 races.

Men 

Standings after 27 races.

Ladies 

Standings after 29 races.

References

Official FIS Freestyle Site

FIS Freestyle Skiing World Cup
2008 in freestyle skiing
2009 in freestyle skiing